Isaac Chirwa (born 24 April 1952) is a Ugandan field hockey player. He competed in the men's tournament at the 1972 Summer Olympics.

References

External links
 

1952 births
Living people
Ugandan male field hockey players
Olympic field hockey players of Uganda
Field hockey players at the 1972 Summer Olympics
Place of birth missing (living people)